Fray Mamerto Esquiú is a department of Catamarca Province in Argentina. The department is named after friar Mamerto Esquiú (1826-1883).

Districts

Agua Colorada
Capilla del Rosario
Club Caza y Pesca
Collagasta
El Hueco
Fray Mamerto Esquiú
La Carrera
La Falda
La Tercena
La Tercera
Las Pirquitas
Payahuaico
Pomancillo Este
Pomancillo Oeste
Quebrada El Cura
San Antonio
San José

External links
Municipal website (Spanish)
Fray Mamerto Esquiú Page (Spanish)
The Life of Fray Mamerto Esquiú (Spanish)

Departments of Catamarca Province